Spring Hill Cemetery Historic District is a national historic district located at Charleston, West Virginia.  The district is a  site located on a series of tree shaded and landscaped hills overlooking central Charleston and includes the following cemeteries: Spring Hill Cemetery (established 1869), Mountain View Cemetery, B'nai Israel Cemetery, Lowenstein Cemetery, and Mount Olivet Cemetery.  It is West Virginia's largest cemetery complex.  The district features Spring Hill Mausoleum, a stone faced reinforced concrete structure constructed in 1910. 
Notable graves throughout the cemetery include the following:
 George W. Atkinson, 10th Governor of West Virginia
 Samuel B. Avis, Member of the United States House of Representatives from 1913 to 1915
 Joseph H. Gaines, Member of the United States House of Representatives from 1901 to 1911
 James Hall Huling, Member of the United States House of Representatives from 1895 to 1897
 Adam Brown Littlepage, Member of the United States House of Representatives from 1911 to 1913, 1915 to 1917 and 1917 to 1919
 William A. MacCorkle, 9th Governor of West Virginia
 Samuel Augustine Miller, Representative for Virginia in Confederate States Congress
 Charles P. Snyder, Member of the United States House of Representatives from 1883 to 1889
 George W. Summers, Representative for Virginia in the United States House of Representatives from 1841 to 1843 and 1843 to 1845, also Whig nominee for Governor in the 1851 election
 Emanuel Willis Wilson, 7th Governor of West Virginia

It was listed on the National Register of Historic Places in 1985.

Gallery

References

External links
 National Register of Historic Places Inventory Nomination Form
 Spring Hill Cemetery Park, Rules and Regulations (includes history), as adopted by the Commission on January 14, 2000
 

Cemeteries on the National Register of Historic Places in West Virginia
Buildings and structures in Charleston, West Virginia
Historic districts in Charleston, West Virginia
Moorish Revival architecture in West Virginia
National Register of Historic Places in Charleston, West Virginia
Protected areas of Kanawha County, West Virginia
Historic districts on the National Register of Historic Places in West Virginia
Cemeteries in West Virginia
Rural cemeteries